The Coalition of Special Act School Districts is a support group for special act school districts operating in New York State. Its chief purpose is to facilitate the views of a branch of New York State public schools that adhere to the guidelines established by legislative special acts that created them to meet the unique needs of students falling under Title I D (neglected and delinquent minors) of NCLB and offer a full or partial residential placement while providing the educational needs of this struggling population. Many of the residents from these communities are assigned to these districts through the court system, committees on special education referrals and social service placements from nearby orphanages and group homes.

Terminology 
These districts are not considered charter schools but instead, completely state-funded public school districts. In addition, they are not the same as Private or State-Run schools. Each of the Special Act School Districts has its own Board of Education which convenes to regulate district policy and procedures.

New York State Special Act school districts
There were originally 20 districts in all. Recent changes in state funding and budgetary reform have resulted in only ten special act school districts left to handle the needs of all special act student populations within New York State. They are as follows.

 Randolph Academy Union Free School District
 Berkshire Union Free School District 
 Little Flower Union Free School District 
 George Junior Republic Union Free School District 
 Greenburgh-Graham Union Free School District 
 Greenburgh Eleven Union Free School District
 Greenburgh-North Castle Union Free School District
 Hawthorne-Cedar Knolls Union Free School District 
 Mount Pleasant-Cottage Union Free School District 
 Mount Pleasant-Blythdale Union Free School District

Former districts:
 Hopevale Union Free School District

More than a few of the New York State Special Act Schools have closed since the 1980s.  The Wiltwyk School(closed) was attended by Claude Brown, author of the 1965 best seller 'Manchild in the Promised land' which chronicled his time at the school.  He credits The Wiltwyk school, overseen by the psychologist Ernst Papanek for his turnaround from juvenile delinquent to serious student and eventual work as mentor to young people in Newark.

The Special Act school districts generally have a small student to teacher ratio and counseling available to students. Many of these districts are closing and funding for the districts is limited.

See also
 Lists of school districts in New York
 No Child Left Behind

References
 Defining progress at Special Act schools - a NYSUT article outlining the unique issues faced by Special Act districts around the state

External links
 National Evaluation and Technical Assistance Center for the Education of Children and Youth Who Are Neglected, Delinquent, or At Risk(NDTAC)
 The "Special Act" public school districts in New York State) - a highbeam article about special act districts in New York State
 STATE MUST ADDRESS NEEDS OF SPECIAL ACT SCHOOLS
 VESID Listing of New York State Special Act School Districts
 New York State Department of Education
 VESID

Education in New York (state)